José Severo Malabia (May 15, 1787 – 1849) was born in nowadays Bolivia. He was a statesman and lawyer based in Argentina. He was a representative to the Congress of Tucumán which on 9 July 1816 declared the Independence of Argentina.

Malabia was born in Chuquisaca and gained his doctorate in laws in 1811.
He was elected by Charcas to the Tucumán Congress and served in 1816 for the declaration. He backed the idea of an Incan monarchy for the United Provinces of the River Plate. 

After the Congress moved to Buenos Aires Malabia chaired it in 1818, later taking an active role in the politics of Buenos Aires. He was a minister in the Supreme Court of Bolivia.

References
Profile by the House of Tucumán

1787 births
1849 deaths
Bolivian expatriates in Argentina
19th-century Bolivian judges
Members of the Congress of Tucumán
People from Buenos Aires
People from Chuquisaca Department
People of the Argentine War of Independence
University of Charcas alumni